The Cruise is a British observational documentary television series directed by Chris Terrill that aired on BBC in 1998.  The series of 12 episodes followed a group of staff on board the luxury cruise ship Galaxy as it sailed the Caribbean on its maiden voyage. The first episode, Let the Dream Begin, aired at 8pm on 13 January 1998. The series was highly popular, attracting 10.39 million viewers (41 per cent audience share). It made a celebrity of Jane McDonald, a cruise ship entertainer on Galaxy, who went on to become a recording artist and television presenter.

Episodes

Specials

Return to... The Cruise
In August 2008, BBC Two broadcast a five-part series called Return to... The Cruise, a retrospective look at the original series, with stars of The Cruise reminiscing about life on board Galaxy, as well as highlights from the series.

References

Citations

Non-inline references 
 Television review - 21 Jan 1998 at The Independent
 Britain's Docusoaps Transfix a Nation of Flies on the Wall - 15 Nov 1998 at The New York Times
  at Der Spiegel
 BBC Two - Return to... The Cruise - Episode Guide at BBC Online
 Ros Goodman to appear in new BBC show - 7 Aug 2008 at The Jewish Chronicle

External links
 
 11-minute extract from The Cruise at BBC Online

1990s British reality television series
1998 British television series debuts
1990s British travel television series
BBC television documentaries